The men's 10 metre platform diving competition at the 2012 Olympic Games in London took place on 10 and 11 August at the Aquatics Centre within the Olympic Park.

The gold medal was won by David Boudia from the United States. China's Qiu Bo won silver and Tom Daley of Great Britain took bronze.

Format
The competition involved three rounds:

Preliminary round: All 32 divers perform six dives; the top 18 divers advance to the semifinal.
Semi-final: The 18 divers perform six dives; the scores of the qualifications are erased and the top 12 divers advance to the final.
Final: The 12 divers perform six dives; the semifinal scores are erased and the top three divers win the gold, silver and bronze medals accordingly.

Schedule 
All times are British Summer Time (UTC+1)

Results

*Daley was awarded a re-dive due to the audience's use of flash photography. His score before the challenge was 75.60.

References

Diving at the 2012 Summer Olympics
2012
Men's events at the 2012 Summer Olympics